Stanislav Yulianovich Zhukovsky (Polish: Stanisław Żukowski) (1873–1944) was a Polish-Russian painter, and a member of Mir iskusstva.

Life
Zhukovsky was born in Yendrikhovtsy (Jędrzychowice), Grodno Province. He was a student of Isaac Levitan and a graduate of the Moscow School of Painting. Zhukovsky became a celebrated landscapist  working in a unique style which projected impressionistic methods and skills as well as his interpretation of the tradition of the Russian realist school. He established his own art studio in Moscow where he mentored students, including later to become a celebrated avantgardist Liubov Popova and a young Vladimir Mayakovsky who was then working as a poster artist.

As a painter, Zhukovsky left a legacy from capturing Russian landscapes and pre-revolutionary sites and the interior of Russian estate houses. His social predisposition left him skeptical of the Bolshevik revolution, and in 1923 he left Soviet Union for his ancestral homeland Poland, then already an independent country.

After the German occupation of Poland during World War II, he was arrested by the Nazis and held at the prisoner transit camp (Durchgangslager) at Pruszków, where he eventually died in 1944.

Themes and series
Spring
Summer
Autumn
Winter
Window to the World
Interior
Noble Nest
Nostalgia

Gallery
Selected works

References

1875 births
1944 deaths
People from Vawkavysk District
People from Volkovyssky Uyezd
19th-century painters from the Russian Empire
Russian male painters
20th-century Russian painters
Russian Impressionist painters
Soviet emigrants to Poland
Polish people who died in Nazi concentration camps
19th-century male artists from the Russian Empire
20th-century Russian male artists